The women's 400 metre individual medley competition at the 2014 South American Games took place on March 8 at the Estadio Nacional.  The last champion was Joanna Maranhão of Brazil.

This race consisted of eight lengths of the pool. The first two lengths were swum using the butterfly stroke, the second pair with the backstroke, the third pair of lengths in breaststroke, and the final two were freestyle.

Records
Prior to this competition, the existing world and Pan Pacific records were as follows:

Results
All times are in minutes and seconds.

Heats
The first round was held on March 8, at 11:31.

Final 
The final was held on March 8, at 19:43.

References

Swimming at the 2014 South American Games